There are about 1400 known moth species of Nigeria. The moths (mostly nocturnal) and butterflies (mostly diurnal) together make up the taxonomic order Lepidoptera.

This is a list of moth species which have been recorded from Nigeria.

Anomoeotidae
Staphylinochrous pygmaea Bethune-Baker, 1911
Staphylinochrous whytei Butler, 1894

Arctiidae
Acantharctia metaleuca Hampson, 1901
Acantharctia mundata (Walker, 1865)
Acantharctia nivea Aurivillius, 1900
Acanthofrontia anacantha Hampson, 1914
Afraloa bifurca (Walker, 1855)
Afrasura dubitabilis Durante, 2009
Afrasura emma Durante, 2009
Afrasura hieroglyphica (Bethune-Baker, 1911)
Afrasura indecisa (Walker, 1869)
Afrasura numida (Holland, 1893)
Afrasura obliterata (Walker, 1864)
Afrasura rivulosa (Walker, 1854)
Afroarctia sjostedti (Aurivillius, 1900)
Afrospilarctia flavida (Bartel, 1903)
Afrowatsonius marginalis (Walker, 1855)
Aloa moloneyi (Druce, 1887)
Alpenus affiniola (Strand, 1919)
Alpenus intacta (Hampson, 1916)
Alpenus investigatorum (Karsch, 1898)
Alpenus maculosa (Stoll, 1781)
Alpenus microsticta (Hampson, 1920)
Alpenus nigropunctata (Bethune-Baker, 1908)
Alpenus thomasi Watson, 1988
Amata borguensis (Hampson, 1901)
Amata interniplaga (Mabille, 1890)
Amata lagosensis (Hampson, 1907)
Amata tritonia (Hampson, 1911)
Amerila brunnea (Hampson, 1901)
Amerila castanea (Hampson, 1911)
Amerila fennia (Druce, 1887)
Amerila luteibarba (Hampson, 1901)
Amerila metasarca (Hampson, 1911)
Amerila nigroapicalis (Aurivillius, 1900)
Amerila niveivitrea (Bartel, 1903)
Amerila pannosa (Grünberg, 1908)
Amerila puella (Fabricius, 1793)
Amerila roseomarginata (Rothschild, 1910)
Amerila rothi (Rothschild, 1910)
Amerila vidua (Cramer, 1780)
Amerila vitrea Plötz, 1880
Amphicallia pactolicus (Butler, 1888)
Amsacta bicoloria (Gaede, 1916)
Amsacta latimarginalis Rothschild, 1933
Amsacta marginalis Walker, 1855
Anapisa lamborni (Rothschild, 1913)
Anapisa monotica (Holland, 1893)
Archilema cinderella (Kiriakoff, 1958)
Archilema subumbrata (Holland, 1893)
Archilema uelleburgensis (Strand, 1912)
Archilema vilis Birket-Smith, 1965
Archithosia costimacula (Mabille, 1878)
Archithosia duplicata Birket-Smith, 1965
Archithosia flavifrontella (Strand, 1912)
Archithosia makomensis (Strand, 1912)
Argina amanda (Boisduval, 1847)
Argina leonina (Walker, 1865)
Balacra batesi Druce, 1910
Balacra daphaena (Hampson, 1898)
Balacra ehrmanni (Holland, 1893)
Balacra flavimacula Walker, 1856
Balacra herona (Druce, 1887)
Balacra humphreyi Rothschild, 1912
Balacra preussi (Aurivillius, 1904)
Balacra pulchra Aurivillius, 1892
Balacra rubricincta Holland, 1893
Binna penicillata Walker, 1865
Binna scita (Walker, 1865)
Caripodia albescens (Hampson, 1907)
Caryatis hersilia Druce, 1887
Caryatis phileta (Drury, 1782)
Caryatis syntomina Butler, 1878
Cragia distigmata (Hampson, 1901)
Creatonotos leucanioides Holland, 1893
Creatonotos punctivitta (Walker, 1854)
Crocosia phaeocraspis Hampson, 1914
Cyana flammeostrigata Karisch, 2003
Cyana rubritermina (Bethune-Baker, 1911)
Disparctia vittata (Druce, 1898)
Eilema albidula (Walker, 1864)
Eilema leia (Hampson, 1901)
Eilema mesosticta Hampson, 1911
Eilema minutissima Bethune-Baker, 1911
Epilacydes scita (Walker, 1865)
Epitoxis borguensis Hampson, 1901
Estigmene rothi Rothschild, 1910
Estigmene unilinea Rothschild, 1910
Euchromia guineensis (Fabricius, 1775)
Euchromia lethe (Fabricius, 1775)
Logunovium nigricosta (Holland, 1893)
Logunovium scortillum Wallengren, 1875
Meganaclia sippia (Plötz, 1880)
Melisa diptera (Walker, 1854)
Metarctia didyma Kiriakoff, 1957
Metarctia flavivena Hampson, 1901
Metarctia haematica Holland, 1893
Metarctia johanna (Kiriakoff, 1979)
Micralarctia punctulatum (Wallengren, 1860)
Muxta xanthopa (Holland, 1893)
Nanna ceratopygia Birket-Smith, 1965
Nanna diplisticta (Bethune-Baker, 1911)
Nanna eningae (Plötz, 1880)
Neuroxena fulleri (Druce, 1883)
Neuroxena funereus (Rothschild, 1933)
Neuroxena medioflavus (Rothschild, 1935)
Neuroxena obscurascens (Strand, 1909)
Nyctemera acraeina Druce, 1882
Nyctemera apicalis (Walker, 1854)
Nyctemera itokina (Aurivillius, 1904)
Nyctemera restrictum (Butler, 1894)
Nyctemera xanthura (Plötz, 1880)
Ovenna guineacola (Strand, 1912)
Ovenna simplex Birket-Smith, 1965
Ovenna subgriseola (Strand, 1912)
Ovenna vicaria (Walker, 1854)
Paralpenus flavizonata (Hampson, 1911)
Phryganopsis asperatella (Walker, 1864)
Phryganopsis cinerella (Wallengren, 1860)
Poliosia nigrifrons Hampson, 1900
Pseudothyretes perpusilla (Walker, 1856)
Pusiola aureola Birket-Smith, 1965
Pusiola celida (Bethune-Baker, 1911)
Pusiola minutissima (Kiriakoff, 1958)
Radiarctia lutescens (Walker, 1854)
Rhipidarctia conradti (Oberthür, 1911)
Rhipidarctia invaria (Walker, 1856)
Rhipidarctia postrosea (Rothschild, 1913)
Siccia conformis Hampson, 1914
Spilosoma aurantiaca (Holland, 1893)
Spilosoma batesi (Rothschild, 1910)
Spilosoma buryi (Rothschild, 1910)
Spilosoma castelli Rothschild, 1933
Spilosoma crossi (Rothschild, 1910)
Spilosoma curvilinea Walker, 1855
Spilosoma holoxantha (Hampson, 1907)
Spilosoma immaculata Bartel, 1903
Spilosoma karschi Bartel, 1903
Spilosoma metaleuca (Hampson, 1905)
Spilosoma occidens (Rothschild, 1910)
Spilosoma rava (Druce, 1898)
Spilosoma sinefascia (Hampson, 1916)
Spilosoma togoensis Bartel, 1903
Stenarctia griseipennis Hampson, 1911
Stenarctia rothi Rothschild, 1933
Teracotona buryi Rothschild, 1910
Tesma nigrapex (Strand, 1912)
Trichaeta schultzei Aurivillius, 1905
Utetheisa pulchella (Linnaeus, 1758)
Yelva obscura Birket-Smith, 1965
Zobida trinitas (Strand, 1912)

Bombycidae
Ocinara ficicola (Westwood & Ormerod, 1889)

Brahmaeidae
Dactyloceras swanzii (Butler, 1871)

Choreutidae
Brenthia octogemmifera Walsingham, 1897
Choreutis inspirata Meyrick, 1916

Cosmopterigidae
Gisilia sclerodes (Meyrick, 1909)

Cossidae
Azygophleps albovittata Bethune-Baker, 1908
Azygophleps inclusa (Walker, 1856)
Azygophleps melanonephele Hampson, 1910
Eulophonotus myrmeleon Felder, 1874
Phragmataecia fuscifusa Hampson, 1910
Phragmataecia sericeata Hampson, 1910
Phragmataecia pelostema (Hering, 1923)
Xyleutes biatra (Hampson, 1910)
Xyleutes polioplaga (Hampson, 1910)

Crambidae
Adelpherupa flavescens Hampson, 1919
Aethaloessa floridalis (Zeller, 1852)
Ancylolomia chrysargyria Hampson, 1919
Ancylolomia holochrea Hampson, 1919
Ancylolomia irrorata Hampson, 1919
Ancylolomia ophiralis Hampson, 1919
Bissetia poliella (Hampson, 1919)
Bocchoris labarinthalis Hampson, 1912
Cadarena sinuata (Fabricius, 1781)
Calamotropha diodonta (Hampson, 1919)
Charltona actinialis Hampson, 1919
Charltona albimixtalis Hampson, 1919
Charltona interstitalis Hampson, 1919
Chilo costifusalis (Hampson, 1919)
Chilo mesoplagalis (Hampson, 1919)
Chilo perfusalis (Hampson, 1919)
Chilo psammathis (Hampson, 1919)
Cirrhochrista grabczewskyi E. Hering, 1903
Cnaphalocrocis poeyalis (Boisduval, 1833)
Coniesta ignefusalis (Hampson, 1919)
Conotalis aurantifascia (Hampson, 1895)
Cotachena smaragdina (Butler, 1875)
Crambus mesombrellus Hampson, 1919
Desmia incomposita (Bethune-Baker, 1909)
Dichocrocis xanthoplagalis Hampson, 1912
Diploptalis metallescens Hampson, 1919
Filodes normalis Hampson, 1912
Haimbachia proalbivenalis (Błeszyński, 1961)
Heliothela ophideresana (Walker, 1863)
Hyalea africalis Hampson, 1912
Lamprosema acyperalis (Hampson, 1912)
Mesolia albimaculalis Hampson, 1919
Mesolia microdontalis (Hampson, 1919)
Metasia arida Hampson, 1913
Metasia perirrorata Hampson, 1913
Mimudea ignitalis (Hampson, 1913)
Mimudea xanthographa (Hampson, 1913)
Nosophora trogobasalis (Hampson, 1912)
Obtusipalpis brunneata Hampson, 1919
Omiodes indicata (Fabricius, 1775)
Ostrinia erythrialis (Hampson, 1913)
Paratraea plumbipicta Hampson, 1919
Parerupa bipunctalis (Hampson, 1919)
Parerupa distictalis (Hampson, 1919)
Patissa fulvicepsalis Hampson, 1919
Patissa monostidzalis Hampson, 1919
Phostria tetrastictalis (Hampson, 1912)
Pilocrocis cuprealis Hampson, 1912
Prionapteryx rubricalis Hampson, 1919
Prionotalis peracutella Hampson, 1919
Prochoristis calamochroa (Hampson, 1919)
Pseudocatharylla argenticilia (Hampson, 1919)
Pseudocatharylla peralbellus (Hampson, 1919)
Pseudonoorda distigmalis (Hampson, 1913)
Pycnarmon sexpunctalis (Hampson, 1912)
Pyrausta melanocera Hampson, 1913
Spoladea recurvalis (Fabricius, 1775)
Sufetula nigrescens Hampson, 1912
Sufetula sufetuloides (Hampson, 1919)
Ulopeza conigeralis Zeller, 1852
Ulopeza nigricostata Hampson, 1912

Drepanidae
Callidrepana amaura (Warren, 1901)
Callidrepana macnultyi Watson, 1965
Callidrepana serena Watson, 1965
Epicampoptera pallida (Tams, 1925)
Epicampoptera strandi Bryk, 1913
Gonoreta contracta (Warren, 1897)
Gonoreta cymba Watson, 1965
Gonoreta gonioptera (Hampson, 1914)
Gonoreta opacifinis Watson, 1965
Isospidia angustipennis (Warren, 1904)
Negera confusa Walker, 1855
Negera disspinosa Watson, 1965
Negera natalensis (Felder, 1874)
Spidia excentrica Strand, 1912
Spidia fenestrata Butler, 1878
Spidia inangulata Watson, 1965
Spidia subviridis (Warren, 1899)
Uranometra oculata (Holland, 1893)

Eupterotidae
Acrojana salmonea Rothschild, 1932
Drepanojana fasciata Aurivillius, 1893
Jana aurivilliusi Rothschild, 1917
Phiala cunina Cramer, 1780
Stenoglene bipartita (Rothschild, 1917)
Stenoglene citrinus (Druce, 1886)
Stenoglene roseus (Druce, 1886)
Vianga magnifica (Rothschild, 1917)

Gelechiidae
Pectinophora gossypiella (Saunders, 1844)
Ptilothyris purpurea Walsingham, 1897
Theatrocopia roseoviridis Walsingham, 1897

Geometridae
Acrostatheusis apicitincta Prout, 1915
Agathia elenaria Swinhoe, 1904
Agathia multiscripta Warren, 1898
Agathia pauper Warren, 1904
Aletis helcita (Linnaeus, 1763)
Aletis vicina Gaede, 1917
Androzeugma tenuis (Warren, 1898)
Anoectomychus pudens (Swinhoe, 1904)
Antharmostes marginata (Warren, 1897)
Antharmostes mesoleuca Warren, 1899
Antitrygodes dysmorpha Prout, 1915
Apatadelpha biocellaria (Walker, 1863)
Aplochlora invisibilis Warren, 1897
Archichlora devoluta (Walker, 1861)
Archichlora marcescens Warren, 1904
Archichlora marginata (Warren, 1902)
Archichlora pulveriplaga (Warren, 1898)
Archichlora viridimacula Warren, 1898
Azyx consocia (Warren, 1899)
Bathycolpodes acoelopa Prout, 1912
Bathycolpodes excavata (Warren, 1898)
Bathycolpodes subfuscata (Warren, 1902)
Bathycolpodes vegeta Prout, 1912
Biston abruptaria (Walker, 1869)
Biston antecreta (Prout, 1938)
Biston subocularia (Mabille, 1893)
Cabera glabra (Warren, 1904)
Cartaletis forbesi (Druce, 1884)
Chiasmia albivia (Prout, 1915)
Chiasmia conturbata (Warren, 1898)
Chiasmia fulvisparsa (Warren, 1897)
Chiasmia impar (Warren, 1897)
Chiasmia majestica (Warren, 1901)
Chiasmia nana (Warren, 1898)
Chiasmia normata (Walker, 1861)
Chiasmia ostentosaria (Möschler, 1887)
Chiasmia streniata (Guenée, 1858)
Chiasmia trirecurvata (Saalmüller, 1891)
Chiasmia umbrata (Warren, 1897)
Chloroclystis consobrina (Warren, 1901)
Chloroctenis similis Warren, 1899
Chlorodrepana rothi Warren, 1899
Chorodnodes rothi Warren, 1897
Chrysocraspeda hilaris (Warren, 1898)
Chrysocraspeda rosina Warren, 1898
Chrysocraspeda rubripennis (Warren, 1898)
Cleora cnephaea Prout, 1915
Cleora derogaria (Snellen, 1872)
Cleora inelegans (Warren, 1905)
Coenina aurivena Butler, 1898
Colocleora divisaria (Walker, 1860)
Colocleora expansa (Warren, 1899)
Colocleora smithi (Warren, 1904)
Colocleora spuria (Prout, 1915)
Comibaena esmeralda (Warren, 1898)
Comibaena flavitaenia (Warren, 1898)
Comibaena longipennis (Warren, 1904)
Comostolopsis rubristicta (Warren, 1899)
Ctenoberta dubia (Warren, 1899)
Cyclophora dewitzi (Prout, 1920)
Cyclophora hirtifemur (Prout, 1932)
Cyclophora leonaria (Walker, 1861)
Cyclophora misella (Prout, 1932)
Cyclophora poeciloptera (Prout, 1920)
Dithecodes ornithospila (Prout, 1911)
Ectropis nigripunctata Warren, 1897
Ectropis subapicata (Warren, 1904)
Eois grataria (Walker, 1861)
Epigynopteryx nigricola (Warren, 1897)
Epigynopteryx straminea (Warren, 1897)
Eucrostes disparata Walker, 1861
Euproutia aggravaria (Guenée, 1858)
Euproutia vernicoma (Prout, 1913)
Exeliopsis ansorgei (Warren, 1905)
Gelasmodes fasciata (Warren, 1899)
Geodena auridisca (Warren, 1904)
Geodena marginalis Walker, 1856
Geodena quadrigutta Walker, 1856
Geodena suffusa Swinhoe, 1904
Geodena surrendra Swinhoe, 1904
Geodena venata Prout, 1915
Gymnoscelis tenera Warren, 1901
Heterocrita bidentata (Bethune-Baker, 1913)
Heterorachis carpenteri Prout, 1915
Heterostegane flavata (Warren, 1905)
Hyalornis docta (Schaus & Clements, 1893)
Hylemeridia majuscula Prout, 1915
Hypocoela subfulva Warren, 1897
Hypocoela turpisaria (Swinhoe, 1904)
Hypomecis intrusilinea (Prout, 1915)
Idaea pulveraria (Snellen, 1872)
Idaea rufimixta (Warren, 1901)
Idaea submaculata (Warren, 1898)
Isturgia catalaunaria (Guenée, 1858)
Isturgia disputaria (Guenée, 1858)
Lathochlora inornata Warren, 1900
Lophorrhachia palliata (Warren, 1898)
Lophorrhachia rubricorpus (Warren, 1898)
Luxiaria ansorgei (Warren, 1903)
Luxiaria curvivena (Warren, 1899)
Melinoessa amplissimata (Walker, 1863)
Melinoessa aureola Prout, 1934
Melinoessa palumbata (Warren, 1894)
Melinoessa perlimbata (Guenée, 1857)
Melinoessa stellata (Butler, 1878)
Melinoessa stramineata (Walker, 1869)
Mesocolpia marmorata (Warren, 1899)
Miantochora incolorata Warren, 1899
Miantochora rufaria (Swinhoe, 1904)
Mixocera albimargo Warren, 1901
Narthecusa tenuiorata Walker, 1862
Neostega flaviguttata Warren, 1903
Omphacodes minima Prout, 1913
Omphalucha brunnea (Warren, 1899)
Omphax rubriceps (Warren, 1904)
Paraptychodes costimaculata Prout, 1913
Perithalera oblongata (Warren, 1898)
Phaiogramma faustinata (Millière, 1868)
Pitthea continua Walker, 1854
Pitthea famula Drury, 1773
Plegapteryx anomalus Herrich-Schäffer, 1856
Plegapteryx sphingata (Warren, 1895)
Prasinocyma congrua (Walker, 1869)
Prasinocyma gemmatimargo Prout, 1915
Prasinocyma pulchraria Swinhoe, 1904
Pycnostega fumosa (Warren, 1897)
Pycnostega obscura Warren, 1905
Racotis squalida (Butler, 1878)
Racotis zebrina Warren, 1899
Rhodometra sacraria (Linnaeus, 1767)
Rhodophthitus myriostictus Prout, 1915
Scopula aphercta Prout, 1932
Scopula elegans (Prout, 1915)
Scopula euphemia Prout, 1920
Scopula flavissima (Warren, 1898)
Scopula habilis (Warren, 1899)
Scopula haemaleata (Warren, 1898)
Scopula inscriptata (Walker, 1863)
Scopula jejuna Prout, 1932
Scopula lactaria (Walker, 1861)
Scopula minorata (Boisduval, 1833)
Scopula ossicolor (Warren, 1897)
Scopula plionocentra Prout, 1920
Scopula proterocelis Prout, 1920
Scopula pyraliata (Warren, 1898)
Scopula serena Prout, 1920
Scopula subperlaria (Warren, 1897)
Scopula supina Prout, 1920
Scopula transsecta (Warren, 1898)
Somatina irregularis (Warren, 1898)
Somatina probleptica Prout, 1917
Sphingomima heterodoxa Warren, 1899
Terina charmione (Fabricius, 1793)
Terina doleris (Plötz, 1880)
Thalassodes opaca Warren, 1898
Thalassodes quadraria Guenée, 1857
Thalassodes unicolor Warren, 1902
Traminda obversata (Walker, 1861)
Unnamed Ennominae genus ansorgeata (Warren, 1903)
Unnamed Ennominae genus rufigrisea (Warren, 1900)
Vaena eacleoides Walker, 1869
Victoria perornata Warren, 1898
Xanthisthisa brunnea (Warren, 1899)
Xanthorhoe euthytoma Prout, 1926
Xenimpia conformis (Warren, 1898)
Xenimpia informis (Swinhoe, 1904)
Xenochroma palimpais Prout, 1934
Xenostega tincta Warren, 1899
Xenostega tyana Swinhoe, 1904
Zamarada acosmeta Prout, 1921
Zamarada acrochra Prout, 1928
Zamarada adumbrata D. S. Fletcher, 1974
Zamarada aerata D. S. Fletcher, 1974
Zamarada aglae Oberthür, 1912
Zamarada anacantha D. S. Fletcher, 1974
Zamarada antimima D. S. Fletcher, 1974
Zamarada auratisquama Warren, 1897
Zamarada bastelbergeri Gaede, 1915
Zamarada bicuspida D. S. Fletcher, 1974
Zamarada catori Bethune-Baker, 1913
Zamarada chrysothyra Hampson, 1909
Zamarada corroborata Herbulot, 1954
Zamarada crystallophana Mabille, 1900
Zamarada cucharita D. S. Fletcher, 1974
Zamarada dentigera Warren, 1909
Zamarada dialitha D. S. Fletcher, 1974
Zamarada dilucida Warren, 1909
Zamarada dolorosa D. S. Fletcher, 1974
Zamarada episema D. S. Fletcher, 1974
Zamarada euerces Prout, 1928
Zamarada euphrosyne Oberthür, 1912
Zamarada excavata Bethune-Baker, 1913
Zamarada flavicosta Warren, 1897
Zamarada fumosa Gaede, 1915
Zamarada griseola D. S. Fletcher, 1974
Zamarada hero D. S. Fletcher, 1974
Zamarada ignicosta Prout, 1912
Zamarada ilaria Swinhoe, 1904
Zamarada intacta Herbulot, 1979
Zamarada ixiaria Swinhoe, 1904
Zamarada labifera Prout, 1915
Zamarada latimargo Warren, 1897
Zamarada lepta D. S. Fletcher, 1974
Zamarada longidens D. S. Fletcher, 1963
Zamarada melanopyga Herbulot, 1954
Zamarada melasma D. S. Fletcher, 1974
Zamarada melpomene Oberthür, 1912
Zamarada mimesis D. S. Fletcher, 1974
Zamarada nasuta Warren, 1897
Zamarada opala Carcasson, 1964
Zamarada paxilla D. S. Fletcher, 1974
Zamarada perlepidata (Walker, 1863)
Zamarada phoenopasta D. S. Fletcher, 1974
Zamarada phrontisaria Swinhoe, 1904
Zamarada pinheyi D. S. Fletcher, 1956
Zamarada polyctemon Prout, 1932
Zamarada protrusa Warren, 1897
Zamarada reflexaria (Walker, 1863)
Zamarada regularis D. S. Fletcher, 1974
Zamarada sagitta D. S. Fletcher, 1974
Zamarada schalida D. S. Fletcher, 1974
Zamarada sicula D. S. Fletcher, 1974
Zamarada sinecalcarata D. S. Fletcher, 1974
Zamarada subincolaris Gaede, 1915
Zamarada subinterrupta Gaede, 1915
Zamarada suda D. S. Fletcher, 1974
Zamarada terpsichore Oberthür, 1912
Zamarada tortura D. S. Fletcher, 1974
Zamarada triangularis Gaede, 1915
Zamarada undimarginata Warren, 1897
Zamarada urania Oberthür, 1912
Zamarada vulpina Warren, 1897
Zamarada xyele D. S. Fletcher, 1974
Zeuctoboarmia pectinata (Warren, 1897)
Zeuctoboarmia sabinei (Prout, 1915)

Gracillariidae
Acrocercops bifasciata (Walsingham, 1891)
Acrocercops fuscapica Bland, 1980
Acrocercops pectinivalva Bland, 1980
Acrocercops rhothiastis Meyrick, 1921
Aristaea onychota (Meyrick, 1908)
Caloptilia fera Triberti, 1989
Caloptilia insolita Triberti, 1989
Caloptilia isotoma (Meyrick, 1914)
Caloptilia leptophanes (Meyrick, 1928)
Caloptilia maynei Ghesquière, 1940
Caloptilia pentaplaca (Meyrick, 1911)
Caloptilia prosticta (Meyrick, 1909)
Caloptilia pseudoaurita Triberti, 1989
Corythoxestis aletreuta (Meyrick, 1936)
Ectropina sclerochitoni Vári, 1961
Ectropina suttoni (Bland, 1980)
Lamprolectica apicistrigata (Walsingham, 1891)
Phyllocnistis citrella Stainton, 1856
Phyllonorycter caudasimplex Bland, 1980
Spulerina quadrifasciata Bland, 1980
Stomphastis adesa Triberti, 1988
Stomphastis conflua (Meyrick, 1914)
Stomphastis thraustica (Meyrick, 1908)

Himantopteridae
Pedoptila catori Bethune-Baker, 1911

Lasiocampidae
Cheligium lineatum (Aurivillius, 1893)
Chrysopsyche albicilia Bethune-Baker, 1911
Chrysopsyche imparilis Aurivillius, 1905
Chrysopsyche mirifica (Butler, 1878)
Cleopatrina bilinea (Walker, 1855)
Euphorea ondulosa (Conte, 1909)
Euwallengrenia reducta (Walker, 1855)
Filiola occidentale (Strand, 1912)
Gastroplakaeis idakum Bethune-Baker, 1913
Gelo anastella Zolotuhin & Prozorov, 2010
Gonometa christyi Sharpe, 1902
Grellada imitans (Aurivillius, 1893)
Hariola haigi (Tams, 1935)
Hypotrabala castanea Holland, 1893
Leipoxais dives Aurivillius, 1915
Leipoxais humfreyi Aurivillius, 1915
Leipoxais marginepunctata Holland, 1893
Leipoxais peraffinis Holland, 1893
Mallocampa audea (Druce, 1887)
Mimopacha cinerascens (Holland, 1893)
Mimopacha gerstaeckerii (Dewitz, 1881)
Mimopacha tripunctata (Aurivillius, 1905)
Morongea cruenta Zolotuhin & Prozorov, 2010
Morongea mastodont Zolotuhin & Prozorov, 2010
Odontocheilopteryx maculata Aurivillius, 1905
Opisthodontia afroio Zolotuhin & Prozorov, 2010
Opisthodontia axividia Zolotuhin & Prozorov, 2010
Opisthodontia pygmy Zolotuhin & Prozorov, 2010
Pachymeta contraria (Walker, 1855)
Pachymetana lamborni (Aurivillius, 1915)
Pachyna subfascia (Walker, 1855)
Pachytrina elygara Zolotuhin & Gurkovich, 2009
Pachytrina gliharta Zolotuhin & Gurkovich, 2009
Pachytrina regeria Zolotuhin & Gurkovich, 2009
Pallastica lateritia (Hering, 1928)
Pallastica mesoleuca (Strand, 1911)
Philotherma sordida Aurivillius, 1905
Pseudometa choba (Druce, 1899)
Pseudometa patagiata Aurivillius, 1905
Pseudometa tenebra (Bethune-Baker, 1911)
Sena punctulata (Aurivillius, 1914)
Streblote splendens (Druce, 1887)
Theophasida cardinalli (Tams, 1926)
Trabala burchardii (Dewitz, 1881)
Trabala lambourni Bethune-Baker, 1911

Limacodidae
Altha ansorgei Bethune-Baker, 1911
Altha rubrifusalis Hampson, 1910
Baria elsa (Druce, 1887)
Casphalia citrimaculata Aurivillius, 1905
Chrysopoloma citrina Druce, 1886
Gavara lamborni (Bethune-Baker, 1915)
Hadraphe aprica Karsch, 1899
Latoia colini Mabille, 1881
Latoia loxotoma (Bethune-Baker, 1911)
Latoia urda (Druce, 1887)
Macroplectra fuscifusa Hampson, 1910
Macroplectra obliquilinea Hampson, 1910
Micraphe lateritia Karsch, 1896
Miresa strigivena Hampson, 1910
Narosa albescens West, 1940
Narosana agbaja Bethune-Baker, 1915
Parasa carnapi Karsch, 1899
Parasa catori Bethune-Baker, 1911
Parasa dentina Hering, 1932
Parasa prussi Karsch, 1896
Parasa serratilinea Bethune-Baker, 1911
Rhypteira sordida Holland, 1893
Stroteroides albitibiata West, 1940
Thosea catori Bethune-Baker, 1908
Trachyptena agbaja (Bethune-Baker, 1915)
Trachyptena rufa Bethune-Baker, 1911

Lymantriidae
Aclonophlebia flaveola Hering, 1926
Batella acronictoides (Collenette, 1937)
Batella muscosa (Holland, 1893)
Bracharoa mixta (Snellen, 1872)
Conigephyra flava (Bethune-Baker, 1911)
Conigephyra unipunctata (Möschler, 1887)
Cropera nigripes (Hampson, 1910)
Crorema mentiens Walker, 1855
Crorema setinoides (Holland, 1893)
Dasychira catori Bethune-Baker, 1911
Dasychira coeruleifascia (Holland, 1893)
Dasychira cromptoni Swinhoe, 1903
Dasychira euproctina (Aurivillius, 1904)
Dasychira griseinubes Hampson, 1910
Dasychira hodoepora Collenette, 1960
Dasychira horrida Swinhoe, 1903
Dasychira ilesha Collenette, 1931
Dasychira magnifica Hampson, 1910
Dasychira melochlora Hering, 1926
Dasychira obliqua (Bethune-Baker, 1911)
Dasychira postalba (Swinhoe, 1906)
Dasychira pulchra Swinhoe, 1906
Dasychira remota Druce, 1887
Dasychira strigidentata Bethune-Baker, 1911
Dasychira umbricolora Hampson, 1910
Dasychirana crenulata Bethune-Baker, 1911
Dasychirana unilineata Bethune-Baker, 1911
Eudasychira anisozyga (Collenette, 1960)
Eudasychira dina (Hering, 1926)
Eudasychira georgiana (Fawcett, 1900)
Eudasychira isozyga (Collenette, 1960)
Eudasychira macnultyi (Collenette, 1957)
Eudasychira quinquepunctata Möschler, 1887
Euproctis aethiopica (Bethune-Baker, 1908)
Euproctis alba Swinhoe, 1903
Euproctis ceramozona Collenette, 1931
Euproctis onii Bethune-Baker, 1911
Euproctis pygmaea (Walker, 1855)
Euproctis quadrifascia Bethune-Baker, 1911
Euproctis tabida (Hering, 1926)
Euproctis utilis Swinhoe, 1903
Euproctoides acrisia Plötz, 1880
Hemerophanes enos (Druce, 1896)
Heteronygmia manicata (Aurivillius, 1892)
Hyaloperina nudiuscula Aurivillius, 1904
Knappetra fasciata (Walker, 1855)
Lacipa argyroleuca Hampson, 1910
Lacipa quadripunctata Dewitz, 1881
Laelia aegra Hering, 1926
Laelia aethiopica Bethune-Baker, 1908
Laelia batoides Plötz, 1880
Laelia fulvicosta Hampson, 1910
Laelia pheosia (Hampson, 1910)
Laelia rocana (Swinhoe, 1906)
Laelia straminea Hampson, 1910
Leucoma gracillima Holland, 1893
Leucoma luteipes (Walker, 1855)
Leucoma ogovensis (Holland, 1893)
Leucoma parva (Plötz, 1880)
Leucoma vata Swinhoe, 1903
Lomadonta saturata Swinhoe, 1904
Marbla affinis (Hering, 1926)
Marbla divisa (Walker, 1855)
Marblepsis flabellaria (Fabricius, 1787)
Marblepsis nyses (Druce, 1887)
Naroma signifera Walker, 1856
Neomardara africana (Holland, 1893)
Olapa tavetensis (Holland, 1892)
Opoboa chrysoparala Collenette, 1932
Opoboa schuetzei Tessmann, 1921
Otroeda cafra (Drury, 1780)
Otroeda nerina (Drury, 1780)
Otroeda vesperina Walker, 1854
Paraproctis osiris Bethune-Baker, 1911
Pseudonotodonta virescens (Möschler, 1887)
Rhypopteryx sordida Aurivillius, 1879
Stracena flavipectus (Swinhoe, 1903)
Stracena fuscivena Swinhoe, 1903
Stracena tottea (Swinhoe, 1903)
Terphothrix callima (Bethune-Baker, 1911)

Metarbelidae
Lebedodes bassa (Bethune-Baker, 1908)
Lebedodes nigeriae Bethune-Baker, 1915
Melisomimas metallica Hampson, 1914
Metarbela bifasciata Gaede, 1929
Metarbela funebris Gaede, 1929
Moyencharia joeli Lehmann, 2013
Moyencharia ochreicosta (Gaede, 1929)
Stenagra multipunctata Hampson, 1920

Micronoctuidae
Micronola yemeni Fibiger, 2011

Noctuidae
Abrostola confusa Dufay, 1958
Aburina phoenocrosmena Hampson, 1926
Aburina tetragramma Hampson, 1926
Acanthodelta janata (Linnaeus, 1758)
Achaea albicilia (Walker, 1858)
Achaea albifimbria (Walker, 1869)
Achaea boris (Geyer, 1837)
Achaea catella Guenée, 1852
Achaea catocaloides Guenée, 1852
Achaea echo (Walker, 1858)
Achaea ezea (Cramer, 1779)
Achaea faber Holland, 1894
Achaea finita (Guenée, 1852)
Achaea indicabilis Walker, 1858
Achaea intercisa Walker, 1865
Achaea lienardi (Boisduval, 1833)
Achaea mormoides Walker, 1858
Achaea obvia Hampson, 1913
Achaea thermopera Hampson, 1913
Achaea xanthodera (Holland, 1894)
Acontia antica Walker, 1862
Acontia citrelinea Bethune-Baker, 1911
Acontia ectorrida (Hampson, 1916)
Acontia fastrei Hacker, Legrain & Fibiger, 2010
Acontia gratiosa Wallengren, 1856
Acontia hemiselenias (Hampson, 1918)
Acontia imitatrix Wallengren, 1856
Acontia insocia (Walker, 1857)
Acontia nigrimacula Hacker, Legrain & Fibiger, 2008
Acontia sphaerophora (Hampson, 1914)
Acontia transfigurata Wallengren, 1856
Acontia vaualbum (Hampson, 1914)
Acontia veroxanthia Hacker, Legrain & Fibiger, 2010
Acontia wahlbergi Wallengren, 1856
Acrapex aenigma (Felder & Rogenhofer, 1874)
Adisura affinis Rothschild, 1921
Aegocera anthina Jordan, 1926
Aegocera humphreyi (Hampson, 1911)
Aegocera obliqua Mabille, 1893
Aegocera rectilinea Boisduval, 1836
Aegocera tigrina (Druce, 1882)
Aethodes angustipennis Hampson, 1918
Agoma trimenii (Felder, 1874)
Agrotis bisignoides Poole, 1989
Agrotis melamesa Hampson, 1913
Amazonides rufescens (Hampson, 1913)
Amyna axis Guenée, 1852
Androlymnia torsivena (Hampson, 1902)
Anigraea siccata (Hampson, 1905)
Anoba microphaea Hampson, 1926
Anomis endochlora Hampson, 1926
Anomis microdonta Hampson, 1926
Anomis pyrocausta Hampson, 1926
Apaegocera argyrogramma Hampson, 1905
Araeopteron canescens (Walker, 1865)
Aspidifrontia berioi Hacker & Hausmann, 2010
Aspidifrontia hemileuca (Hampson, 1909)
Aspidifrontia pulverea Hampson, 1913
Aspidifrontia villiersi (Laporte, 1972)
Athetis magniplagia (Hampson, 1918)
Attatha metaleuca Hampson, 1913
Audea endophaea Hampson, 1913
Audea humeralis Hampson, 1902
Audea kathrina Kühne, 2005
Audea melaleuca Walker, 1865
Audea paulumnodosa Kühne, 2005
Autoba brachygonia (Hampson, 1910)
Avatha ethiopica (Hampson, 1913)
Avitta insignifica Hampson, 1926
Avitta ionomesa Hampson, 1926
Baniana disticta Hampson, 1926
Bocula ichthyuropis Hampson, 1926
Bocula sticticraspis Hampson, 1926
Brevipecten confluens Hampson, 1926
Brevipecten politzari Hacker & Fibiger, 2007
Calesia fulviceps Hampson, 1926
Caligatus angasii Wing, 1850
Callophisma flavicornis Hampson, 1913
Callopistria complicata (Holland, 1894)
Callopistria cyanopera (Hampson, 1911)
Callopistria maillardi (Guenée, 1862)
Callopistria nana (Hampson, 1911)
Callopistria nephrosticta (Hampson, 1908)
Callopistria nigeriensis (Hampson, 1918)
Callopistria occidens (Hampson, 1908)
Callopistria thermochroa (Hampson, 1911)
Callyna holophaea Hampson, 1911
Capnodes albicostata Poole, 1989
Caryonopera triangularis (Bethune-Baker, 1911)
Catada rex Bethune-Baker, 1911
Catephia cryptodisca Hampson, 1926
Catephia holophaea Hampson, 1926
Catephia microcelis Hampson, 1926
Cerocala albicornis Berio, 1966
Cerocala caelata Karsch, 1896
Chalciope pusilla (Holland, 1894)
Chasmina tibialis (Fabricius, 1775)
Chasmina vestae (Guenée, 1852)
Chrysodeixis acuta (Walker, [1858])
Claterna gracillodina Hampson, 1926
Colbusa euclidica Walker, 1865
Colbusa restricta Hampson, 1918
Corgatha porphyrea Hampson, 1910
Crameria amabilis (Drury, 1773)
Cretonia platyphaeella Walker, 1866
Crypsotidia maculifera (Staudinger, 1898)
Crypsotidia mesosema Hampson, 1913
Crypsotidia parva Rothschild, 1921
Ctenoplusia dorfmeisteri (Felder & Rogenhofer, 1874)
Ctenusa pallida (Hampson, 1902)
Cyligramma latona (Cramer, 1775)
Cyligramma limacina (Guérin-Méneville, 1832)
Cyligramma magus (Guérin-Méneville, [1844])
Cyligramma simplex Grünberg, 1910
Deinopa lilacina Hampson, 1926
Diparopsis watersi (Rothschild, 1901)
Drepanopses rufipicta Hampson, 1926
Dysgonia angularis (Boisduval, 1833)
Dysgonia humilis Holland, 1894
Dysgonia palpalis (Walker, 1865)
Dysgonia perexcurvata (Hampson, 1918)
Dysgonia pudica (Möschler, 1887)
Dysgonia torrida (Guenée, 1852)
Dysgonia trogosema (Hampson, 1913)
Egnasia microtype Hampson, 1926
Egnasia scotopasta Hampson, 1926
Egnasia trogocraspia Hampson, 1926
Enispa albipuncta Hampson, 1910
Enispa atriceps Hampson, 1910
Enispa lycaugesia Hampson, 1910
Enmonodiops ochrodiscata Hampson, 1926
Entomogramma pardus Guenée, 1852
Episparis fenestrifera Bryk, 1915
Ercheia subsignata (Walker, 1865)
Erebus walkeri (Butler, 1875)
Ethiopica exolivia Hampson, 1911
Ethiopica melanopa Bethune-Baker, 1911
Ethiopica polyastra Hampson, 1909
Euaethiops cyanopasta Hampson, 1926
Eublemma anachoresis (Wallengren, 1863)
Eublemma bifasciata (Moore, 1881)
Eublemma cochylioides (Guenée, 1852)
Eublemma flaviciliata Hampson, 1910
Eublemma lacteicosta Hampson, 1910
Eublemma phaeapera Hampson, 1910
Eublemma proleuca Hampson, 1910
Eublemma ragusana (Freyer, 1844)
Eublemma robertsi Berio, 1969
Eublemma scotopis Bethune-Baker, 1911
Eublemma staudingeri (Wallengren, 1875)
Eudocima divitiosa (Walker, 1869)
Eudocima materna (Linnaeus, 1767)
Eudrapa lepraota Hampson, 1926
Eudrapa metathermeola Hampson, 1926
Eudrapa mollis Walker, 1857
Eudrapa olivaria Hampson, 1926
Euippodes euprepes Hampson, 1926
Euminucia conflua Hampson, 1913
Euneophlebia acutissima Berio, 1972
Eutelia albiluna Hampson, 1905
Eutelia cautabasis Hampson, 1905
Eutelia chlorobasis Hampson, 1905
Eutelia discitriga Walker, 1865
Eutelia ferridorsata Hampson, 1905
Eutelia holocausta Hampson, 1905
Eutelia leucodelta Hampson, 1905
Eutelia menalcas (Holland, 1894)
Eutelia metasarca Hampson, 1905
Eutelia nigridentula Hampson, 1905
Eutelia ochricostata Hampson, 1905
Eutelia polychorda Hampson, 1902
Eutelia porphyriota (Hampson, 1912)
Eutelia quadriliturata Walker, 1869
Eutelia snelleni Saalmüller, 1881
Eutelia subrubens (Mabille, 1890)
Eutelia violescens (Hampson, 1912)
Facidia luteilinea Hampson, 1926
Feliniopsis medleri (Laporte, 1973)
Feliniopsis nigribarbata (Hampson, 1908)
Feliniopsis wojtusiaki Hacker & Fibiger, 2007
Focillopis eclipsia Hampson, 1926
Fodina oxyprora (Bethune-Baker, 1911)
Geniascota lacteata Hampson, 1926
Geniascota trichoptycha Hampson, 1926
Gesonia obeditalis Walker, 1859
Gesonia stictigramma Hampson, 1926
Gracilodes metopis Hampson, 1926
Gracilodes opisthenops Hampson, 1926
Grammodes congenita Walker, 1858
Grammodes geometrica (Fabricius, 1775)
Grammodes stolida (Fabricius, 1775)
Helicoverpa assulta (Guenée, 1852)
Heliophisma catocalina Holland, 1894
Heliophisma klugii (Boisduval, 1833)
Heraclia geryon (Fabricius, 1781)
Heraclia hornimani (Druce, 1880)
Heraclia longipennis (Walker, 1854)
Heraclia medeba (Druce, 1880)
Heraclia pallida (Walker, 1854)
Heraclia poggei (Dewitz, 1879)
Heraclia terminatis (Walker, 1856)
Herpeperas lavendula Hampson, 1926
Herpeperas phoenopasta Hampson, 1926
Hollandia spurrelli Hampson, 1926
Holocryptis melanosticta Hampson, 1910
Homodina argentifera Hampson, 1926
Hypena conscitalis Walker, 1866
Hypena obacerralis Walker, [1859]
Hypocala deflorata (Fabricius, 1794)
Hypocala rostrata (Fabricius, 1794)
Hypopyra capensis Herrich-Schäffer, 1854
Hyposada melanosticta Hampson, 1910
Hypotacha isthmigera Wiltshire, 1968
Hypotuerta transiens (Hampson, 1901)
Iambia jansei Berio, 1966
Iambia thwaitesi (Moore, 1885)
Isadelphina albistellata Hampson, 1926
Isadelphina cheilosema Hampson, 1926
Isadelphina rufaria Hampson, 1926
Isadelphina xylochroa Hampson, 1926
Leucania fissifascia (Hampson, 1907)
Leucania insulicola Guenée, 1852
Leucania miasticta (Hampson, 1918)
Libystica crenata Hampson, 1926
Lophoptera litigiosa (Boisduval, 1833)
Loxioda ectherma Hampson, 1926
Lycophotia viridis Hampson, 1911
Macella euritiusalis Walker, 1859
Macellopis ustata Hampson, 1926
Marathyssa cuneata (Saalmüller, 1891)
Marcipa apicalis Hampson, 1926
Marcipa dimera Hampson, 1926
Marcipa eucrines (Bethune-Baker, 1911)
Marcipa molybdea Hampson, 1926
Marcipa monosema Hampson, 1926
Marcipa ruptisigna Hampson, 1926
Masalia albiseriata (Druce, 1903)
Masalia bimaculata (Moore, 1888)
Masalia flaviceps (Hampson, 1903)
Masalia flavistrigata (Hampson, 1903)
Masalia galatheae (Wallengren, 1856)
Masalia nubila (Hampson, 1903)
Masalia rubristria (Hampson, 1903)
Masalia transvaalica (Distant, 1902)
Massaga angustifascia Rothschild, 1896
Massaga hesparia (Cramer, 1775)
Massaga maritona Butler, 1868
Massaga virescens Butler, 1874
Matopo selecta (Walker, 1865)
Maxera euryptera Hampson, 1926
Mazuca dulcis Jordan, 1933
Mazuca strigicincta Walker, 1866
Mecodina ochrigrapta Hampson, 1926
Mecodopsis conisema Hampson, 1926
Medlerana nigeriensis Laporte, 1979
Melanephia nigrescens (Wallengren, 1856)
Mesogenea excavata Hampson, 1926
Mesosciera picta Hampson, 1926
Mesosciera rubrinotata Hampson, 1926
Metagarista maenas (Herrich-Schäffer, 1853)
Metagarista triphaenoides Walker, 1854
Mimasura clara (Holland, 1893)
Miniodes discolor Guenée, 1852
Miniodes phaeosoma Hampson, 1913
Misa memnonia Karsch, 1895
Mitrophrys latreillii (Herrich-Schäffer, 1853)
Mitrophrys menete (Cramer, 1775)
Mocis frugalis (Fabricius, 1775)
Mocis mayeri (Boisduval, 1833)
Mocis mutuaria (Walker, 1858)
Mocis proverai Zilli, 2000
Mocis undata (Fabricius, 1775)
Mythimna atritorna (Hampson, 1911)
Mythimna natalensis (Butler, 1875)
Naarda unipunctata Bethune-Baker, 1911
Nagia evanescens Hampson, 1926
Nagia microsema Hampson, 1926
Nephelemorpha semaphora Hampson, 1926
Niphosticta stigmagrapta Hampson, 1926
Nyodes brevicornis (Walker, 1857)
Odontestra goniosema Hampson, 1913
Oglasa atristipata Hampson, 1926
Oglasa aulota Hampson, 1926
Oglasa confluens Hampson, 1926
Oglasa diagonalis Hampson, 1926
Oglasa holophaea Hampson, 1926
Oglasa phaeonephele Hampson, 1926
Oglasa rufimedia Hampson, 1926
Oglasa tessellata Hampson, 1926
Oligia ambigua (Walker, 1858)
Oligia melanodonta Hampson, 1908
Ophisma teterrima Hampson, 1913
Ophiusa conspicienda (Walker, 1858)
Ophiusa david (Holland, 1894)
Ophiusa despecta (Holland, 1894)
Ophiusa dilecta Walker, 1865
Ophiusa selenaris (Guenée, 1852)
Oraesia emarginata (Fabricius, 1794)
Oraesia politzari Behounek, Hacker & Speidel, 2010
Oraesia provocans Walker, [1858]
Oruza divisa (Walker, 1862)
Oruza dolichognatha Hampson, 1918
Oruza latifera (Walker, 1869)
Ozarba domina (Holland, 1894)
Ozarba epimochla Bethune-Baker, 1911
Ozarba rubrivena Hampson, 1910
Pangrapta seriopuncta Hampson, 1926
Panilla xylonea Hampson, 1926
Parachalciope benitensis (Holland, 1894)
Parachalciope binaria (Holland, 1894)
Parachalciope deltifera (Felder & Rogenhofer, 1874)
Parachalciope euclidicola (Walker, 1858)
Parafodina ectrogia (Hampson, 1926)
Paralephana camptocera Hampson, 1926
Paralephana incurvata Hampson, 1926
Paralephana leucopis Hampson, 1926
Paralephana metaphaea Hampson, 1926
Paralephana nigripalpis Hampson, 1926
Paralephana patagiata Hampson, 1926
Parallelura palumbiodes (Hampson, 1902)
Pericyma mendax (Walker, 1858)
Pericyma polygramma Hampson, 1913
Phaegorista similis Walker, 1869
Phaeoscia canipars Hampson, 1926
Phalerodes cauta (Hampson, 1902)
Phlogochroa albiguttula Hampson, 1926
Phlogochroa haemorrhanta (Bethune-Baker, 1911)
Phlogochroa melanomesa Hampson, 1926
Phytometra nyctichroa (Hampson, 1926)
Plecoptera androconiata Hampson, 1926
Plecoptera costisignata Hampson, 1926
Plecoptera geminilinea Hampson, 1926
Plecoptera mesostriga Hampson, 1926
Plecoptera resistens (Walker, 1858)
Plecopterodes melliflua (Holland, 1897)
Plecopterodes moderata (Wallengren, 1860)
Plusia hemichalcea (Hampson, 1913)
Plusiodonta ionochrota Hampson, 1926
Polydesma umbricola Boisduval, 1833
Polytela cliens (Felder & Rogenhofer, 1874)
Polytelodes florifera (Walker, 1858)
Prionofrontia ochrosia Hampson, 1926
Prolymnia atrifera Hampson, 1911
Pseudoarcte melanis (Mabille, 1890)
Pseudogiria hypographa (Hampson, 1926)
Pseudozarba bipartita (Herrich-Schäffer, 1950)
Remigiodes remigina (Mabille, 1884)
Rhabdophera clathrum (Guenée, 1852)
Rhesalides nigeriensis Hampson, 1926
Rhynchina leucodonta Hampson, 1910
Rhynchina paliscia Bethune-Baker, 1911
Rhynchina tinctalis (Zeller, 1852)
Rougeotiana xanthoperas (Hampson, 1926)
Saroba isocyma Hampson, 1926
Sarothroceras banaka (Plötz, 1880)
Schausia leona (Schaus, 1893)
Soloella guttivaga (Walker, 1854)
Sphingomorpha chlorea (Cramer, 1777)
Spodoptera cilium Guenée, 1852
Spodoptera exempta (Walker, 1857)
Spodoptera exigua (Hübner, 1808)
Spodoptera littoralis (Boisduval, 1833)
Spodoptera mauritia (Boisduval, 1833)
Stictoptera confluens (Walker, 1858)
Syngrapha circumflexa (Linnaeus, 1767)
Sypnoides equatorialis (Holland, 1894)
Tachosa acronyctoides Walker, 1869
Tathodelta furvitincta Hampson, 1926
Tatorinia pallidipennis Hampson, 1926
Tatorinia rufipennis Hampson, 1926
Tavia nana Hampson, 1926
Taviodes congenita Hampson, 1926
Taviodes discomma Hampson, 1926
Taviodes excisa Hampson, 1926
Thalatha occidens Hampson, 1911
Thiacidas dukei (Pinhey, 1968)
Thiacidas juvenis Hacker & Zilli, 2007
Thiacidas kanoensis Hacker & Zilli, 2007
Thiacidas meii Hacker & Zilli, 2007
Thiacidas mukim (Berio, 1977)
Thiacidas stassarti Hacker & Zilli, 2007
Thyas metaphaea (Hampson, 1913)
Thyas parallelipipeda (Guenée, 1852)
Thysanoplusia cupreomicans (Hampson, 1909)
Timora umbrifascia Hampson, 1913
Timora unifascia Bethune-Baker, 1911
Tolna sinifera Hampson, 1913
Tolna sypnoides (Butler, 1878)
Tolna versicolor Walker, 1869
Trichopalpina zethesia Hampson, 1926
Trigonodes hyppasia (Cramer, 1779)
Ugia duplicilinea Hampson, 1926
Ugia stigmaphora Hampson, 1926
Ugia straminilinea Hampson, 1926
Ulotrichopus tinctipennis (Hampson, 1902)
Zethesides pusilla Hampson, 1926

Nolidae
Aiteta costiplaga Hampson, 1905
Aiteta escalerai Kheil, 1909
Aiteta gamma (Hampson, 1905)
Aiteta meterythra Hampson, 1905
Aiteta veluta Hampson, 1912
Arcyophora patricula (Hampson, 1902)
Blenina chloromelana (Mabille, 1890)
Blenina chrysochlora (Walker, 1865)
Blenina diagona Hampson, 1912
Bryophilopsis anomoiota (Bethune-Baker, 1911)
Bryophilopsis lunifera Hampson, 1912
Bryophilopsis tarachoides Mabille, 1900
Bryothripa miophaea Hampson, 1912
Earias biplaga Walker, 1866
Earias cupreoviridis (Walker, 1862)
Earias glaucescens (Hampson, 1905)
Earias insulana (Boisduval, 1833)
Earias ogovana Holland, 1893
Eligma hypsoides (Walker, 1869)
Garella nephelota Hampson, 1912
Gigantoceras rectilinea Hampson, 1912
Hypodeva barbata Holland, 1894
Hypodeva nocturna (Hampson, 1905)
Iscadia glaucograpta (Hampson, 1912)
Leocyma camilla (Druce, 1887)
Lophocrama auritincta (Hampson, 1905)
Lophocrama phoenicochlora Hampson, 1912
Maurilia albirivula Hampson, 1905
Maurilia arcuata (Walker, [1858])
Maurilia atrirena Hampson, 1918
Maurilia heterochroa Hampson, 1905
Maurilia phaea Hampson, 1905
Maurilia rufirena Hampson, 1918
Meganola cretacea (Hampson, 1914)
Metaleptina albibasis Holland, 1893
Metaleptina albilinea Hampson, 1912
Metaleptina digramma (Hampson, 1905)
Metaleptina dileuca Hampson, 1912
Metaleptina geminastra (Hampson, 1905)
Metaleptina microcyma (Hampson, 1905)
Metaleptina nigribasis Holland, 1893
Neaxestis piperita (Hampson, 1905)
Negeta approximans Hampson, 1912
Negeta luminosa (Walker, 1858)
Negeta mesoleuca (Holland, 1894)
Negeta phaeopepla (Hampson, 1905)
Negeta stalactitis (Hampson, 1905)
Neonegeta purpurea Hampson, 1912
Neonegeta trigonica (Hampson, 1905)
Neonegeta xanthobasis (Hampson, 1905)
Nola apicalis (Hampson, 1903)
Nola atripuncta (Hampson, 1909)
Nola chionea Hampson, 1911
Nola melanoscelis (Hampson, 1914)
Nola omphalota (Hampson, 1903)
Nola perfusca Hampson, 1911
Nola phaeocraspis (Hampson, 1909)
Odontestis prosticta (Holland, 1894)
Pardoxia graellsii (Feisthamel, 1837)
Periplusia cinerascens Holland, 1894
Periplusia nubilicosta Holland, 1894
Plusiocalpe pallida Holland, 1894
Risoba lunata (Möschler, 1887)
Selepa cumasia Hampson, 1912
Selepa docilis Butler, 1881
Selepa leucograpta Hampson, 1912
Westermannia anchorita Holland, 1893
Westermannia goodi Hampson, 1912

Notodontidae
Acroctena pallida (Butler, 1882)
Afroplitis dierli (Kiriakoff, 1979)
Afroplitis politzaria (Kiriakoff, 1979)
Amphiphalera leuconephra Hampson, 1910
Anaphe subsordida Butler, 1893
Anaphe venata Butler, 1878
Antheua bidentata (Hampson, 1910)
Antheua delicata Bethune-Baker, 1911
Antheua rufovittata (Aurivillius, 1901)
Aprosdocetos inexpectata (Rothschild, 1917)
Arciera lanuginosa (Rothschild, 1917)
Baliopteryx baccata (Hampson, 1910)
Boscawenia polioplaga (Hampson, 1910)
Bostrychogyna bella (Bethune-Baker, 1913)
Brachychira ferruginea Aurivillius, 1905
Catarctia subrosea Bethune-Baker, 1911
Chlorocalliope rivata (Hampson, 1910)
Chlorochadisra pinheyi Kiriakoff, 1975
Crestonica incisus (Rothschild, 1917)
Desmeocraera ardalio Kiriakoff, 1958
Desmeocraera dicax Kiriakoff, 1958
Desmeocraera formosa Kiriakoff, 1958
Desmeocraera glauca Gaede, 1928
Desmeocraera imploratrix Kiriakoff, 1958
Desmeocraera latex (Druce, 1901)
Desmeocraera latifasciata Gaede, 1928
Desmeocraera leucosticta (Hampson, 1910)
Desmeocraera mawa Kiriakoff, 1979
Desmeocraera mkabi Kiriakoff, 1979
Desmeocraera olivina Kiriakoff, 1958
Desmeocraera sincera Kiriakoff, 1958
Desmeocraera vicaria Kiriakoff, 1979
Desmeocraerula pallida Kiriakoff, 1963
Enomotarcha chloana (Holland, 1893)
Enomotarcha metaphaea Kiriakoff, 1979
Epicerura catori (Bethune-Baker, 1911)
Epicerura tamsi Kiriakoff, 1963
Janthinisca badia Kiriakoff, 1979
Janthinisca gerda Kiriakoff, 1979
Janthinisca linda Kiriakoff, 1979
Janthinisca politzari Kiriakoff, 1979
Mainiella subterminalis Kiriakoff, 1962
Odontoperas obliqualinea (Bethune-Baker, 1911)
Odontoperas rosacea Kiriakoff, 1959
Paradiastema monotonia Kiriakoff, 1979
Paradiastema nitens Bethune-Baker, 1911
Paradiastema pulverea Hampson, 1910
Phalera atrata (Grünberg, 1907)
Psalisodes bistriata (Kiriakoff, 1962)
Quista citrina Kiriakoff, 1979
Quista niveiplaga (Hampson, 1910)
Roppa rhabdophora (Hampson, 1910)
Scalmicauda ectoleuca Hampson, 1910
Scalmicauda macrosema Kiriakoff, 1959
Scalmicauda rubrolineata Kiriakoff, 1959
Scalmicauda vinacea Kiriakoff, 1959
Scalmicauda xanthogyna Hampson, 1910
Scrancia astur Kiriakoff, 1962
Scrancia cupreitincta Kiriakoff, 1962
Scrancia expleta Kiriakoff, 1962
Scrancia leucopera Hampson, 1910
Scrancia rothschildi Kiriakoff, 1965
Scrancia tephraea (Bethune-Baker, 1911)
Scranciola rufula (Hampson, 1910)
Stauropussa chloe (Holland, 1893)
Stenostaura vittata Kiriakoff, 1965
Synete parallelis Kiriakoff, 1979
Synete subcaeca Kiriakoff, 1959
Tmetopteryx bisecta (Rothschild, 1917)
Tricholoba minuta Kiriakoff, 1979
Tricholoba unicolor Kiriakoff, 1979
Xanthodonta argyllacea Kiriakoff, 1961
Xanthodonta minima (Hampson, 1910)

Oecophoridae
Stathmopoda ficivora Kasy, 1973

Pantheidae
Raphia buchanani Rothschild, 1921

Psychidae
Eumeta cervina Druce, 1887
Eumeta rotunda Bourgogne, 1965
Eumeta rougeoti Bourgogne, 1955
Melasina immanis Meyrick, 1908
Melasina trichodyta Meyrick, 1924

Pterophoridae
Crocydoscelus ferrugineum Walsingham, 1897
Exelastis vuattouxi Bigot, 1970
Hellinsia aethiopicus (Amsel, 1963)
Hepalastis pumilio (Zeller, 1873)
Lantanophaga pusillidactylus (Walker, 1864)
Megalorhipida leucodactylus (Fabricius, 1794)
Platyptilia molopias Meyrick, 1906
Pterophorus albidus (Zeller, 1852)
Pterophorus spissa (Bigot, 1969)
Sphenarches anisodactylus (Walker, 1864)
Stenoptilodes taprobanes (Felder & Rogenhofer, 1875)

Pyralidae
Acracona remipedalis (Karsch, 1900)
Lamoria imbella (Walker, 1864)
Palmia adustalis (Hampson, 1917)

Saturniidae
Bunaeopsis hersilia (Westwood, 1849)
Decachorda fletcheri Rougeot, 1970
Epiphora perspicuus (Butler, 1878)
Epiphora rectifascia Rothschild, 1907
Goodia hierax Jordan, 1922
Gynanisa maja (Klug, 1836)
Holocerina angulata (Aurivillius, 1893)
Holocerina smilax (Westwood, 1849)
Imbrasia obscura (Butler, 1878)
Lobobunaea acetes (Westwood, 1849)
Lobobunaea phaedusa (Drury, 1782)
Ludia hansali Felder, 1874
Ludia obscura Aurivillius, 1893
Nudaurelia alopia Westwood, 1849
Orthogonioptilum adiegetum Karsch, 1892
Orthogonioptilum prox Karsch, 1892
Pseudantheraea discrepans (Butler, 1878)
Pseudantheraea imperator Rougeot, 1962
Rohaniella pygmaea (Maassen & Weymer, 1885)

Sesiidae
Melittia chalconota Hampson, 1910
Pseudomelittia cingulata Gaede, 1929
Sura rufitibia Hampson, 1919
Tipulamima sexualis (Hampson, 1910)
Trichocerata lambornella (Durrant, 1913)

Sphingidae
Acherontia atropos (Linnaeus, 1758)
Andriasa contraria Walker, 1856
Antinephele anomala (Butler, 1882)
Cephonodes hylas (Linnaeus, 1771)
Falcatula cymatodes (Rothschild & Jordan, 1912)
Hippotion irregularis (Walker, 1856)
Leucophlebia afra Karsch, 1891
Lophostethus dumolinii (Angas, 1849)
Neopolyptychus ancylus (Rothschild & Jordan, 1916)
Neopolyptychus consimilis (Rothschild & Jordan, 1903)
Neopolyptychus prionites (Rothschild & Jordan, 1916)
Neopolyptychus pygarga (Karsch, 1891)
Nephele bipartita Butler, 1878
Nephele maculosa Rothschild & Jordan, 1903
Nephele peneus (Cramer, 1776)
Phylloxiphia bicolor (Rothschild, 1894)
Phylloxiphia vicina (Rothschild & Jordan, 1915)
Platysphinx constrigilis (Walker, 1869)
Platysphinx phyllis Rothschild & Jordan, 1903
Platysphinx stigmatica (Mabille, 1878)
Platysphinx vicaria Jordan, 1920
Polyptychoides digitatus (Karsch, 1891)
Polyptychus andosa Walker, 1856
Polyptychus anochus Rothschild & Jordan, 1906
Polyptychus carteri (Butler, 1882)
Polyptychus coryndoni Rothschild & Jordan, 1903
Polyptychus hollandi Rothschild & Jordan, 1903
Polyptychus orthographus Rothschild & Jordan, 1903
Polyptychus wojtusiaki Pierre, 2001
Pseudenyo benitensis Holland, 1889
Pseudoclanis molitor (Rothschild & Jordan, 1912)
Pseudoclanis rhadamistus (Fabricius, 1781)
Pseudopolyptychus foliaceus (Rothschild & Jordan, 1903)
Sphingonaepiopsis nana (Walker, 1856)
Temnora angulosa Rothschild & Jordan, 1906
Temnora avinoffi Clark, 1919
Temnora camerounensis Clark, 1923
Temnora griseata Rothschild & Jordan, 1903
Temnora hollandi Clark, 1920
Temnora reutlingeri (Holland, 1889)
Temnora stevensi Rothschild & Jordan, 1903
Theretra orpheus (Herrich-Schäffer, 1854)
Theretra perkeo Rothschild & Jordan, 1903
Theretra tessmanni Gehlen, 1927

Thyrididae
Amalthocera tiphys Boisduval, 1836
Byblisia albaproxima Bethune-Baker, 1911
Byblisia latipes Walker, 1865
Byblisia ochracea Jordan, 1907
Collinsa subscripta (Warren, 1899)
Cornuterus palairanta (Bethune-Baker, 1911)
Dysodia collinsi Whalley, 1968
Dysodia intermedia (Walker, 1865)
Dysodia vitrina (Boisduval, 1829)
Dysodia zelleri (Dewitz, 1881)
Epaena trijuncta (Warren, 1898)
Hapana verticalis (Warren, 1899)
Heteroschista nigranalis Warren, 1903
Hypolamprus curviflua (Warren, 1898)
Kalenga ansorgei (Warren, 1899)
Kuja fractifascia (Warren, 1908)
Kuja gemmata (Hampson, 1906)
Marmax hyparchus (Cramer, 1779)
Marmax semiaurata (Walker, 1854)
Nemea eugrapha (Hampson, 1906)
Ninia plumipes (Drury, 1782)
Opula spilotata (Warren, 1898)
Rhodoneura serraticornis (Warren, 1899)
Sijua latizonalis (Hampson, 1897)
Sijua sigillata (Warren, 1898)
Striglina rothi Warren, 1898
Symphleps suffusa Warren, 1898
Trichobaptes auristrigata (Plötz, 1880)

Tineidae
Acridotarsa melipecta (Meyrick, 1915)
Ceratophaga vastellus (Zeller, 1852)
Dasyses nigerica Gozmány, 1968
Edosa nigralba (Gozmány, 1968)
Edosa phlegethon (Gozmány, 1968)
Erechthias travestita (Gozmány, 1968)
Hyperbola pastoralis (Meyrick, 1931)
Monopis jacobsi Gozmány, 1967
Monopis megalodelta Meyrick, 1908
Perissomastix nigerica Gozmány, 1967
Perissomastix sericea Gozmány, 1966
Perissomastix similatrix Gozmány, 1968
Perissomastix stibarodes (Meyrick, 1908)
Phalloscardia semiumbrata (Meyrick, 1920)
Phereoeca praecox Gozmány & Vári, 1973
Phereoeca proletaria (Meyrick, 1921)
Phthoropoea oenochares (Meyrick, 1920)
Pitharcha chalinaea Meyrick, 1908
Sphallestasis cristata (Gozmány, 1967)
Syncalipsis optania (Meyrick, 1908)
Syncalipsis typhodes (Meyrick, 1917)
Tinemelitta ceriaula (Meyrick, 1914)
Tiquadra cultrifera Meyrick, 1914
Wegneria speciosa (Meyrick, 1914)

Tortricidae
Accra rubrothicta Razowski, 1986
Accra viridis (Walsingham, 1891)
Apotoforma fustigera Razowski, 1986
Basigonia anisoscia Diakonoff, 1983
Brachiolia wojtusiaki Razowski, 1986
Cornesia ormoperla Razowski, 1981
Ebodina lagoana Razowski & Tuck, 2000
Eccopsis incultana (Walker, 1863)
Eccopsis praecedens Walsingham, 1897
Eccopsis wahlbergiana Zeller, 1852
Nephograptis necropina Razowski, 1981
Panegyra sectatrix (Razowski, 1981)
Paraeccopsis insellata (Meyrick, 1920)
Plinthograptis clostos Razowski, 1990
Plinthograptis clyster Razowski, 1990
Plinthograptis pleroma Razowski, 1981
Plinthograptis rhytisma Razowski, 1981
Plinthograptis seladonia (Razowski, 1981)
Plinthograptis sipalia Razowski, 1981
Rubidograptis regulus Razowski, 1981
Rubrograptis recrudescentia Razowski, 1981
Russograptis callopista (Durrant, 1913)
Russograptis medleri Razowski, 1981
Russograptis solaris Razowski, 1981
Rutilograptis cornesi Razowski, 1981
Sanguinograptis obtrecator Razowski, 1981
Sanguinograptis ochrolegnia Razowski, 1986

Uraniidae
Acropteris nigrisquama Warren, 1897
Epiplema inelegans Warren, 1898

Zygaenidae
Astyloneura esmeralda (Hampson, 1920)
Tasema unxia (Druce, 1896)

References

External links 

Nigeria
Moths
Nigeria
Nigeria